Trelleborg may refer to:

 Viking ring castles, colloquially known as "Trelleborgar"
 Trelleborg (Slagelse), a Viking ring castle in Denmark
 Trelleborg, Sweden's southernmost city and the seat of Trelleborg Municipality
 Trelleborg Municipality the southernmost municipality of Sweden
 Trelleborg Parish, a parish of the Church of Sweden
 Trelleborg AB, a Swedish company
 M/S Trelleborg, name of two ships built in 1958 and 1982